In recreational number theory, a minimal prime is a prime number for which there is no shorter subsequence of its digits in a given base that form a prime. In base 10 there are exactly 26 minimal primes:
2, 3, 5, 7, 11, 19, 41, 61, 89, 409, 449, 499, 881, 991, 6469, 6949, 9001, 9049, 9649, 9949, 60649, 666649, 946669, 60000049, 66000049, 66600049 .

For example, 409 is a minimal prime because there is no prime among the shorter subsequences of the digits: 4, 0, 9, 40, 49, 09. The subsequence does not have to consist of consecutive digits, so 109 is not a minimal prime (because 19 is prime). But it does have to be in the same order; so, for example, 991 is still a minimal prime even though a subset of the digits can form the shorter prime 19 by changing the order.

Similarly, there are exactly 32 composite numbers which have no shorter composite subsequence:
4, 6, 8, 9, 10, 12, 15, 20, 21, 22, 25, 27, 30, 32, 33, 35, 50, 51, 52, 55, 57, 70, 72, 75, 77, 111, 117, 171, 371, 711, 713, 731 .

There are 146 primes congruent to 1 mod 4 which have no shorter prime congruent to 1 mod 4 subsequence:
5, 13, 17, 29, 37, 41, 61, 73, 89, 97, 101, 109, 149, 181, 233, 277, 281, 349, 409, 433, 449, 677, 701, 709, 769, 821, 877, 881, 1669, 2221, 3001, 3121, 3169, 3221, 3301, 3833, 4969, 4993, 6469, 6833, 6949, 7121, 7477, 7949, 9001, 9049, 9221, 9649, 9833, 9901, 9949, ... 

There are 113 primes congruent to 3 mod 4 which have no shorter prime congruent to 3 mod 4 subsequence:

3, 7, 11, 19, 59, 251, 491, 499, 691, 991, 2099, 2699, 2999, 4051, 4451, 4651, 5051, 5651, 5851, 6299, 6451, 6551, 6899, 8291, 8699, 8951, 8999, 9551, 9851, ...

Other bases

Minimal primes can be generalized to other bases. It can be shown that there are only a finite number of minimal primes in every base. Equivalently, every sufficiently large prime contains a shorter subsequence that forms a prime. 

Number of minimal (probable) primes in base n are
1, 2, 3, 3, 8, 7, 9, 15, 12, 26, 152, 17, 228, 240, 100, 483, 1280, 50, 3463, 651, 2601, 1242, 6021, 306, (17608 or 17609), 5664, 17215, 5784, (57296 or 57297), 220, ...

The length of the largest minimal (probable) prime in base n are
2, 2, 3, 2, 5, 5, 5, 9, 4, 8, 45, 8, 32021, 86, 107, 3545, (≥111334), 33, (≥110986), 449, (≥479150), 764, 800874, 100, (≥136967), (≥8773), (≥109006), (≥94538), (≥174240), 1024, ...

Largest minimal (probable) prime in base n (written in base 10) are
2, 3, 13, 5, 3121, 5209, 2801, 76695841, 811, 66600049, 29156193474041220857161146715104735751776055777, 388177921, ... (next term has 35670 digits) 

Number of minimal composites in base n are
1, 3, 4, 9, 10, 19, 18, 26, 28, 32, 32, 46, 43, 52, 54, 60, 60, 95, 77, 87, 90, 94, 97, 137, 117, 111, 115, 131, 123, 207, ...

The length of the largest minimal composite in base n are
4, 4, 3, 3, 3, 4, 3, 3, 2, 3, 3, 4, 3, 3, 2, 3, 3, 4, 3, 3, 2, 3, 3, 4, 2, 3, 2, 3, 3, 4, ...

Notes

References
Chris Caldwell, The Prime Glossary: minimal prime, from the Prime Pages
A research of minimal primes in bases 2 to 30
Minimal primes and unsolved families in bases 2 to 30
Minimal primes and unsolved families in bases 28 to 50
J. Shallit, Minimal primes, Journal of Recreational Mathematics, 30:2, pp. 113–117, 1999-2000.
PRP records, search by form 8*13^n+183 (primes of the form 8{0}111 in base 13), n=32020
PRP records, search by form (51*21^n-1243)/4 (primes of the form C{F}0K in base 21), n=479149
PRP records, search by form (106*23^n-7)/11 (primes of the form 9{E} in base 23), n=800873

Classes of prime numbers
Base-dependent integer sequences